Robert Mark Gabriel (August 23, 1902 in Leyton – February 1957) was a New Zealand mathematician at the University of Otago who worked on analysis, in particular on Green's functions.

References
The Mathematics and Statistics Department at the University of Otago

Academic staff of the University of Otago
1902 births
1957 deaths
20th-century New Zealand mathematicians